{{DISPLAYTITLE:C14H16N2O2}}
The molecular formula C14H16N2O2 may refer to: 

 o-Dianisidine, a chemical precursor to dyes
 Etomidate, a short acting intravenous anaesthetic agent 
 Imiloxan, an alpha blocker
 4,5-MDO-DMT, a lesser-known psychedelic drug
 Tetramethylxylene diisocyanate